The Canadian Bowl is the championship of the Canadian Junior Football League. The three conference champions participate in the playdowns for the championship. One champion receives a bye to the game, while the other two play off in the Jostens Cup. The bye rotates among the three conferences. The 2022 champions are the Okanagan Sun and the Saskatoon Hilltops have won the most championships with 22 Canadian Bowl victories.

Canadian Bowl
Since 1989 the game has been known as the Canadian Bowl.

Armadale Cup
From 1976 to 1988 the Canadian championship was known as the Armadale Cup.

Leader Post trophy
From 1925 to 1975 the Canadian championship was known as the Leader Post trophy.

References

External links
CJFL Team Standings 1887-2011 

 
Canadian football trophies and awards
Canadian football competitions